Horsburgh is a surname. Notable people with the surname include:

James Horsburgh (1762–1836), Scottish hydrographer
John Horsburgh (1791–1869), Scottish engraver
Lynette Horsburgh (born 1974), Scottish semi-professional pool and snooker player
Margaret Horsburgh (born 1943), New Zealand academic
Wayne Horsburgh, Australian country music entertainer

See also 

 Horsbrugh